Mechowo  is a village in the administrative district of Gmina Puck, within Puck County, Pomeranian Voivodeship, in northern Poland. The village has a population of 409.

Mechowo is on the border of the Darżlubie forest. Points of interest include caves, a church built in 1742, 19th-century houses and an 18th-century manor.

References

Villages in Puck County